The Billboard Regional Mexican Songs is a subchart of the Latin Airplay chart that ranks the best-performing songs on Regional Mexican radio stations in the United States. Published weekly by Billboard magazine, it ranks the "most popular regional Mexican songs, ranked by radio airplay audience impressions as measured by Nielsen Music".

Chart history

References

United States Regional Mexican Songs
2023 in Mexican music
Regional Mexican 2023
2023 in Latin music